Wijnaldum is a village in Friesland in the Netherlands.

Wijnaldum is also a surname and may refer to:
 Georginio Wijnaldum, Dutch football player
 Giliano Wijnaldum, Dutch football player
 Yasmin Wijnaldum, Dutch fashion model